Gaymont is a historic home located near Aurora, Preston County, West Virginia. It was built about 1896 as a summer resort cottage.  It is a two-story, "T"-shaped dwelling constructed of wood, wood shingles, wood half-timbers, and cut stone.  It displays eclectic overtones of American Craftsman, Rustic, and Queen Anne architectural styles.  It features a low-pitched, cross-gabled, and hipped roof and wraparound, Queen Anne style verandah.

It was listed on the National Register of Historic Places in 1992.  It is located in the Brookside Historic District.

References

Houses on the National Register of Historic Places in West Virginia
Queen Anne architecture in West Virginia
Houses completed in 1896
Houses in Preston County, West Virginia
Bungalow architecture in West Virginia
American Craftsman architecture in West Virginia
Rustic architecture in West Virginia
National Register of Historic Places in Preston County, West Virginia
Historic district contributing properties in West Virginia